The  San Diego Chargers season was the franchise's 36th season in the National Football League, and the 46th overall. The Chargers failed to improve on their 12–4 record in 2004, and finished the campaign 9–7 and 3rd overall in their division, missing out on the playoffs for the first time since 2003. Outside linebacker Shawne Merriman was named Rookie of the Year at the end of the season.

Despite missing the playoffs, the Chargers defeated some of the best teams in the NFL, such as the defending Super Bowl champions New England Patriots (41–17) and the previously undefeated Indianapolis Colts (26–17; ending the prospect of a perfect season). Following the season, Drew Brees would sign as a free agent with the New Orleans Saints. Brees would be replaced by Philip Rivers who would become their starter for the next 14 seasons.

Offseason

NFL Draft

Personnel

Staff

Roster

Preseason

Schedule 
In addition to their regular games with AFC West rivals, the Chargers played teams from the AFC East and NFC East as per the schedule rotation, and also played intraconference games against the Steelers and the Colts based on divisional positions from 2004.

Note: Intra-division opponents are in bold text.

Week 1: vs. Dallas Cowboys

Standings

References

External links 

San Diego Chargers
San Diego Chargers seasons
San Diego Chargers